Epicadus is a genus of crab spiders that was first described by Eugène Louis Simon in 1895. It is considered a senior synonym of Tobias.

Species
 it contains eleven species, found in South and Central America:
Epicadus camelinus (O. Pickard-Cambridge, 1869) – Peru, Bolivia, Brazil
Epicadus dimidiaster Machado, Teixeira & Lise, 2018 – Colombia, Peru, Brazil
Epicadus granulatus Banks, 1909 – Costa Rica, Peru, Brazil
Epicadus heterogaster (Guérin, 1829) (type) – Costa Rica, Panama, Colombia, Venezuela, Guyana, Ecuador, Peru, Bolivia, Brazil, Paraguay, Argentina
Epicadus pulcher (Mello-Leitão, 1929) – Bolivia, Brazil
Epicadus rubripes Mello-Leitão, 1924 – Brazil
Epicadus stelloides (Walckenaer, 1837) – Puerto Rico, Virgin Is., Venezuela, Brazil
Epicadus taczanowskii (Roewer, 1951) – Hispaniola, Costa Rica, Panama to Peru, Bolivia, Brazil
Epicadus tigrinus Machado, Teixeira & Lise, 2018 – Costa Rica, Panama
Epicadus trituberculatus (Taczanowski, 1872) – Mexico, Panama, Peru, Bolivia, French Guiana, Brazil, Argentina
Epicadus tuberculatus (Petrunkevitch, 1910) – Panama, Ecuador, Peru, Brazil

Formerly included:
E. mutchleri Petrunkevitch, 1930 (Transferred to Rejanellus)

Nomina dubia
E. albicans (Mello-Leitão, 1929
E. albovittatus (Caporiacco, 1954
E. corticatus (Mello-Leitão, 1917
E. flavus (Giebel, 1863
E. gradiens (Mello-Leitão, 1929
E. polyophthalmus (Mello-Leitão, 1929
E. ruber (Giebel, 1863

See also
 List of Thomisidae species

References

Further reading

Araneomorphae genera
Spiders of Central America
Spiders of South America
Thomisidae